Hugues du Perche was a 10th-century French noble. He was the youngest son of Fulcois, the Count of Perche, probably of the family of viscounts from Châteaudun, and his wife, Melisende. He was also one of the first known ancestors in male line of the Plantagenets.

He married Béatrice de Mâcon, widow of Geoffroy I, Count Gatinais. She was the daughter of Albéric ou Aubry II de Mâcon, comte de Mâcon. The children from this marriage were:

 Geoffrey II, Count of Gâtinais. He was known by the nickname Ferréol ("Ironwood"). By his marriage with Ermengarde of Anjou, his descendants would not only become Count of Anjou, but King of Jerusalem and England as well.
 Liétaud ( † 1050), Lord of Yèvres of 1028-1050.

In the charter that his step-son Aubry, Count Gâtinais, and Francon, Bishop of Paris signed May 26, 1028, he is quoted as a witness, along with his two sons Geoffroy and Liétaud. It is this act that evidences the second marriage of Beatrice with Hugues du Perche.

Being from a vassal family of the counts of Blois, while the counts Gâtinais were faithful to the Capetian kings of France, the marriage took place probably during a period of rapprochement between the two families, during the marriage of King Robert II the Pious and Bertha of Burgundy, widow of Eudes I of Blois, between 996 and 1003.

Sources 
 :
 Édouard de Saint Phalle, « Les comtes de Gâtinais aux Xe et XIe siècle »

Medieval French nobility
10th-century French people